Project Offices is the name sometimes used to refer to several structurally dependable facilities maintained by the AT&T Corporation in the northeastern United States since the middle 20th century to house an ongoing, non-public, company project.

History and purpose
AT&T began constructing Project Offices in the 1960s. Since the inception of the Project Offices program, the company has chosen not to disclose the exact nature of business conducted at Project Offices.  However, it has described them as "central facilities". According to an article in The Charlotte Observer, the sites were intended as nuclear bunkers for government and military officials.

Sites
The location of several Project Offices have been described in media reports.

Big Hole

A Project Office located in Chatham County, North Carolina, colloquially known as "Big Hole", came online in the mid-1960s and was described by area residents and persons employed in the construction of the site as being "department-store sized" with walls "several feet thick" covered in copper, buried  underground on large shock-absorbing springs, constructed with plumbing made out of rubber, and outfitted with tropospheric scatter antennas. The Big Hole Project Office was located on 191 acres of company-owned land surrounded with fencing, CCTV cameras, and steel crash barriers. According to observers of the Project Offices program, the physical description of Big Hole is consistent with the design of other known Project Offices.

Big Hole may have been shuttered in 2008; media noted at the time that several convoys of trucks appeared to have moved large amounts of equipment out of the site over the course of several weeks and a company guard force had been withdrawn.

Peters Mountain
A Project Office is located at, or inside, Peters Mountain in Charlottesville, Virginia. According to Albemarle County building permits issued to AT&T, the site underwent $61 million of updates in 2007.

Short Hill Mountain
A Project Office located on Short Hill Mountain in Virginia was originally constructed in the 1960s and involved excavation of a large section of the mountain. In 2016 AT&T announced plans to expand the site, what it referred to in zoning documents as "Project Aurelia", by adding a "structure described to be as large as a Costco store with eight super generators and a huge water storage tank at the site". The corporation "abruptly abandoned" Project Aurelia after local government officials proposed a public hearing on the construction to address environmental concerns.

Urban legends
Due to the private nature of Project Office business activities, wild claims and urban legends have sometimes accompanied description of the sites. Some residents of the Peters Mountain Project Office have claimed that "anti-aircraft artillery" was moved to the mountaintop in 2001. Residents near Short Hill Mountain claim the mountaintop is illuminated in blue lights at nighttime. Big Hole, meanwhile, has generated claims of aberrant lightning activity being witnessed over the site.

See also
 33 Thomas Street
 FAIRVIEW

References

AT&T buildings